Aulonemia haenkei is a species of Aulonemia bamboo.

Synonyms 
There are 3 synonyms.

Distribution 
Aulonemia haenkei is endemic to Peru and Ecuador.

Description 
Aulonemia haenkei has 3 lodicules, 3 stamen, and 2 stigmas. It is perennial and caespitose with short Rhizomes, making it a pachymorph. Its culms erect, allowing the plant to grow up to heights of 150–200 cm long, due to its woody s tem.

References 

haenkei